Tegegne Bezabeh (born 9 September 1941) is a retired Ethiopian sprinter. He competed at the 1964, 1968 and 1972 Olympics in the 400 m event with the best achievement of sixth place in 1968.

His best time (45.42) on 400 meter is also current Ethiopian record.

References

1941 births
Living people
Ethiopian male sprinters
Olympic athletes of Ethiopia
Athletes (track and field) at the 1964 Summer Olympics
Athletes (track and field) at the 1968 Summer Olympics
Athletes (track and field) at the 1972 Summer Olympics
African Games medalists in athletics (track and field)
African Games silver medalists for Ethiopia
Athletes (track and field) at the 1973 All-Africa Games
20th-century Ethiopian people